Sumner Stone (born 9 June 1945 in Venice, Florida) is a typeface designer and graphic artist. He notably designed ITC Stone while working for Adobe. A specimen of ITC Stone is shown at his personal website.

Career
Stone studied at Reed College, graduating with a degree in sociology in 1967, and earned an MA in Mathematics from Sonoma State University in 1977. After graduating from Reed, he took calligraphy lessons with Lloyd Reynolds.

1969–1971
 Lettering Artist, Hallmark Cards. Kansas City, Missouri
1972–1979
 Principal, Alpha & Omega Press, Sonoma, California
1979–1983
 Director of Typographic Development, Autologic, Inc., Thousand Oaks, California
1983–1984
 Director of Typography and Design, Camex, Inc. Boston, Massachusetts	
1984–1989
 Director of Typography, Adobe Systems, Inc., Mountain View, California: participated in the development of digitizing and editing tools; designed what was to become the ITC Stone typeface family; established and directed the Adobe Originals program; directed the business, technical, and design aspects of producing Japanese fonts in collaboration with the Morisawa company in Japan; invented and participated in the initial development of the Multiple Masters font software

Since 1990, Stone has owned and run the Stone Type Foundry, now located in Guinda, California.

Typefaces
Arepo
Basalt
Cycles
Davanti
ITC Bodoni
ITC Stone (Stone Sans, Stone Humanist, Stone Serif, Stone Informal)
ITC Stone II (Stone Sans)
Leaves & Straw
Magma
Munc
Numa
Popvlvs
Sator
Scripps College Old Style
SFPL
Silica
Stone Print
Tuff

Publications
"Transitions in Letterform: The Pre-Serif Letter". EJF Journal, January 2007.

Rock Wraps Paper, Inscriptions at the Old Public Library of San Francisco. Jack W. Stauffacher, ed. San Francisco: The Book Club of California and San Francisco Public Library, 2003.

"The Imperial Roman Letter". Society of Fellows News, American Academy in Rome, Fall 2003.

"Becoming Type", in Calligraphic Type Design in the Digital Age. John Prestianni, ed. San Francisco: Gingko Press, 2002.

Font: Sumner Stone, Calligraphy and Type Design in a Digital Age. Ditchling: Ditchling Museum and the Edward Johnston Foundation, 2000.

Foreword to Adrian Wilson, The Design of Books. San Francisco: Chronicle Books, 1993.

On Stone: The Art and Use of Typography on the Personal Computer. San Francisco: Bedford Arts, 1991. (Also published as Typography on the Personal Computer. London: Lund Humphries, 1991.)

"Forgotten Characters: An Adventure in Typographic Navigation", in Designer's Guide to Typography. Nancy Aldrich-Reunzel and John Fennell, eds. New York: Watson-Guptill, 1991.

"Hans Eduard Meier's Syntax Antiqua" and "The Stone Family of Typefaces: New Voices for the Electronic Age", in Fine Print on Type. Charles Bigelow and Linnea Gentry, eds. San Francisco: Bedford Arts, 1989.

References

External links
 Stone Type Foundry
 dot-font: Type Tradition in a Digital Age
Sumner Stone Fonts - Fonts.com
U&lc Online Issue: 30.1.2 Featured Designer: Sumner Stone
Font Designer – Sumner Stone

Reed College alumni
American typographers and type designers
1945 births
Living people
Sonoma State University alumni
Adobe Inc. people